Vermilion Airport  is located adjacent to Vermilion, Alberta, Canada.

References

Registered aerodromes in Alberta